Riley Chun-Young O'Brien (born February 6, 1995) is an American professional baseball pitcher in the Seattle Mariners organization. He has previously played in MLB for the Cincinnati Reds. He made his MLB debut in 2021.

Amateur career
O'Brien attended Shorewood High School in Shoreline, Washington, where he played baseball. He graduated in 2013, and then enrolled at Everett Community College. After two seasons at Everett, he transferred to the College of Idaho. As a junior in 2016, he went 6–3 with a 3.23 ERA and sixty strikeouts over 69 innings. In 2017, his senior year, he pitched to a 3–4 record and a 2.15 ERA over 67 innings. After the season, he was selected by the Tampa Bay Rays in the eighth round of the 2017 Major League Baseball draft.

Professional career

Tampa Bay Rays organization
O'Brien signed with the Rays and made his professional debut that year with the Princeton Rays of the Advanced Rookie Appalachian League, going 1–0 with a 2.20 ERA over 11 games (ten starts). During the season, he was named Appalachian League Pitcher of the Week twice. In 2018, he began the season with the Bowling Green Hot Rods of the Class A Midwest League (with whom he was named an All-Star) before being promoted to the Charlotte Stone Crabs of the Class A-Advanced Florida State League, with whom he ended the year; over 25 games (13 starts) between both teams, he went 8–4 with a 2.75 ERA. In 2019, he began the season with Charlotte and was promoted to the Montgomery Biscuits of the Class AA Southern League in May. Over 20 games (17 starts) with the two clubs, he pitched to a 7–6 record and 3.16 ERA.

O'Brien did not play a minor league game in 2020 due to the cancellation of the minor league season caused by the COVID-19 pandemic.

Cincinnati Reds
On August 28, 2020, the Rays traded O'Brien to the Cincinnati Reds in exchange for Cody Reed. On November 20, 2020, O'Brien was added to the 40-man roster. To begin the 2021 season, he was assigned to the Louisville Bats of the Triple-A East. Over 23 games (22 starts), O'Brien pitched to a 7-7 record, a 4.55 ERA, and 121 strikeouts over  innings.

On September 28, 2021, the Reds selected O'Brien to the active roster to make his MLB debut versus the Chicago White Sox. He was the starting pitcher and threw  innings, giving up two solo home runs while walking three and striking out two.

On April 13, 2022, the Reds designated O'Brien for assignment to make room for Nick Lodolo.

Seattle Mariners
On April 16, 2022, the Reds traded O’Brien to the Seattle Mariners for cash considerations or a player to be named later. (On June 3, minor league infielder Luis Chevalier was sent to Cincinnati to complete the trade). He was designated for assignment on May 27, 2022. He cleared waivers and was sent outright to the Triple-A Tacoma Rainiers on June 2.

Personal life
O'Brien's grandfather, Johnny O'Brien, played six seasons in the major leagues.

References

External links

1995 births
Living people
Baseball players from Seattle
Major League Baseball pitchers
Cincinnati Reds players
Seattle Mariners players
Everett Trojans baseball players
College of Idaho Coyotes baseball players
Princeton Rays players
Bowling Green Hot Rods players
Charlotte Stone Crabs players
Montgomery Biscuits players
Louisville Bats players
Tacoma Rainiers players